There have been few documented and undocumented wolf attacks on humans in North America in comparison to wolf attacks in Eurasia, and few relative to attacks by other larger carnivores.

Fatal attacks
Below is an amalgamated list of verified, questionable and unverified attacks.

Non-fatal attacks
Because of the relative rarity of documented wolf attacks on humans in North America, some non-fatal attacks have been of interest to experts.

See also
List of wolf attacks

Species:
 Coyote attacks on humans
 Fatal dog attacks in the United States
 List of fatal bear attacks in North America
 List of fatal cougar attacks in North America

References

Bibliography

Canid attacks
North America-related lists
 
Death-related lists
Deaths due to animal attacks in the United States
wolf attacks in North America
Animal attacks by geographic location